David Haig Collum Ward  (born 20 September 1955) is an English actor and playwright. He has appeared in West End productions and numerous television and film roles over a career spanning four decades.

Haig wrote the play My Boy Jack, which premièred at the Hampstead Theatre on 13 October 1997. On Remembrance Day 2007, ITV broadcast a television drama based on the play, in which Haig played Rudyard Kipling and Daniel Radcliffe played Kipling's son, John. He went on to star as the Player in Rosencrantz and Guildenstern are Dead alongside Radcliffe in 2017.

Haig's second play The Good Samaritan was also first staged at the Hampstead Theatre, opening on 6 July 2000. His third play Pressure premiered at the Chichester Festival in 2014, before being revived in 2018 on a UK Tour and then in the West End at the Ambassadors Theatre. In 2018, he portrayed Bill in the critically acclaimed BBC America thriller series Killing Eve.

Haig was appointed Member of the Order of the British Empire (MBE) in the 2013 Birthday Honours for services to drama.

Early life
Haig was born on 20 September 1955 in  Aldershot, Hampshire, the son of opera singer Shirley R. C. (née Brooks) and army officer (and later director of the Hayward Gallery) Francis W. He had a younger sister who died at 22 of a brain aneurysm when he was 26. He grew up in Rugby, Warwickshire where he attended Rugby School.

Career

Film and television
Haig appeared in the 1994 film Four Weddings and a Funeral and had a supporting role in the BBC television sitcom The Thin Blue Line playing Inspector Grim, the inept foil to Rowan Atkinson's Inspector Fowler. He also appeared in Love on a Branch Line, a TV series broadcast by the BBC in four episodes. In 2002 he played the brother of Four Weddings''' co-star Hugh Grant in the romantic comedy Two Weeks Notice. In 2007, he appeared in a Comic Relief sketch called "Mr. Bean's Wedding" as the bride's father, reuniting with Atkinson.

Other TV work includes Doctor Who story The Leisure Hive (1980); Blake's 7 episode "Rumours of Death" (1980);  Diamonds (1981 TV series); Campion story Sweet Danger (1990); Inspector Morse episode "Dead on Time" (1992); and Cracker story To Say I Love You (1993). In the 1990s, he appeared in series 1 of the TV series Soldier Soldier.

He appears in the Richard Fell adaptation of the 1960s science fiction series A for Andromeda, on the UK digital television station BBC Four. 
Haig wrote the play My Boy Jack and later appeared in the television adaptation as Rudyard Kipling, with Daniel Radcliffe playing Kipling's son, John.

In 2008, he appeared in the BBC film Dustbin Baby and The 39 Steps. He also appeared in the Midsomer Murders episode "The Glitch". In 2009 he appeared as Steve Fleming in BBC TV's The Thick of It and as Jon, husband to former MP Mo Mowlam in the drama Mo opposite Julie Walters. Also in 2009, he appeared in two episodes as the headmaster of Portwenn Primary School, Mr Straine on ITV comedy drama Doc Martin.

In January 2013, Haig started appearing as Jim Hacker in a re-make of classic 1980s comedy series Yes Prime Minister, broadcast on Gold TV in the United Kingdom.

In 2012 a new sitcom pilot, starring Haig and written by Ben Elton, was filmed for the BBC. Filming for a full six-part series of the sitcom, The Wright Way (formerly known as Slings and Arrows) was completed in March 2013, and began airing on BBC One on 23 April.

An August 2018 announcement indicated that Haig would be among the new cast to join the original actors in the Downton Abbey film which started principal photography at about the same time. In September 2018 he appeared in the critically acclaimed BBC series Killing Eve.

Radio
In 2008, he played Maurice Haigh-Wood in the BBC Radio adaptation of Michael Hastings' play Tom and Viv, and 2010 he starred as Norman Birkett in "Norman Birkett and the Case of the Coleford Poisoner" on BBC Radio 4's Afternoon Play series. He also played the narrator and the older Lewis Eliot in C. P. Snow's "Strangers and Brothers" on Radio 4 in 2003, repeated on Radio 4 Extra every few years.

Stage
He also won an Olivier Award in 1988 for Actor of the Year in a New Play, for his performance in Our Country's Good at the Royal Court in Sloane Square. He toured Britain with the stage version of My Boy Jack, which he wrote, and in which he played Rudyard Kipling and directed a production of Private Lives by Noël Coward, which made a national tour in 2005.

Haig has appeared in several stage productions in London's West End, including Hitchcock Blonde at the Royal Court, Life X 3 at the Savoy Theatre, as the character Osborne in R.C. Sherriff's play Journey's End at the Comedy Theatre, and as Mr George Banks in Mary Poppins at the Prince Edward Theatre for which he received an Olivier Award nomination. He was also nominated for playing Christopher Headingley in a revival of Michael Frayn's comedy Donkeys' Years at the Comedy Theatre. Having appeared in the role of Pinchwife in the comedy The Country Wife at the Royal Haymarket Theatre in London, he appeared in The Sea at the same theatre. Haig's next role was Truscott in the Joe Orton black farce Loot at London's Tricycle Theatre from 11 December 2008 to 31 January 2009 and at the Theatre Royal, Newcastle, 2 to 7 February 2009.

In 2010 he played the role of Jim Hacker in the stage version of Yes, Prime Minister'' at the Chichester Festival Gielgud Theatre, in London's West End from 17 September 2010.

Filmography

Theatre

TV and film

References

External links
 
 SANDS website

1955 births
Alumni of the London Academy of Music and Dramatic Art
English male film actors
English male stage actors
English male television actors
Living people
Laurence Olivier Award winners
Members of the Order of the British Empire
People from Rugby, Warwickshire
20th-century English male actors
21st-century English male actors
Male actors from Hampshire